The Union of the Robert Schuman Institute for Developing Democracy in Central and Eastern Europe (short: Robert Schuman Institute, RSI) is the European level training institution of the European People’s Party political family, based in Budapest, Hungary. It was founded in 1995 as the successor of the Christian Democratic Academy for Central and Eastern Europe. The members of the union of RSI are political parties, organisations and foundations and its main activity comprises political and civic education.

The institute is named after Robert Schuman, a French Christian-Democratic politician, former French Prime Minister and Finance Minister, who is also considered one of the "founding fathers" today's European Union.

The founding organisations of RSI  
The RSI was founded by:

 European Union of Christian Democrats
 The Robert Schuman Foundation Luxembourg
 The Foundation for European Studies
 The European People's Party / Christian Democrats (EPP)
 Centre for Political, Economical and Social Studies (CEPESS), Belgium
 Christian Democratic People's Party (KDNP), Hungary
 Fondation d'Etudes Européens, international organisation
 Fondation Robert Schuman, Luxemburg
 Haza és Haladás Foundation, Hungary
 Hungarian Democratic Forum (MDF), Hungary
 István Barankovics Foundation, Hungary
 Lajos Batthyány Foundation, Hungary
 Lakitelek Foundation, Hungary
 Partido Popular, Spain
 Parti Populaire Européen, international organisation
 Unio Democratica de Catalunya, Spain

Mission 
The RSI's mission is:

 Promoting the idea of a united Europe, the basic values of the EPP and Christian Democracy
 Supporting the process of democratic transformation and the development of civil societies in Central, Eastern and South Eastern Europe
 Contributing to the development of the EPP sister and co-operating parties by education and training
 Facilitating the information flow between EU members, accession countries and neighbouring European states
 Building up a cross-border network based on shared values and political orientation

Members of the Union of the Robert Schuman Institute

References 

 http://fidelitas.hu/cikk/fidelitasos_szakmai_program_a_robert_schuman_intezet_nemzetkozi_kepzesen
 http://www.kas.de/ungarn/hu/about/partners/
 http://www.eppgroup.eu/hu/networks
 http://www.schuman-institute.eu/
 http://kicsweden.org/en/our-publications/robert-schuman-institute/

Further reading 
 Thomas Jansen and Steven van Hecke. At Europe's Service: The Origins and Evolution of the European People's Party. (Heidelberg: Springer-Verlag / Centre for European Studies, 2011).
 Wilfried Martens: Europe: I Struggle, I Overcome. (Heidelberg: Springer-Verlag / Centre for European Studies, 2008).
 Erhard von der Bank, Kinga Szabó: The Effects of Robert Schuman's Ideas in Today's Europe (2007).
 Wahl, Jürgen: Magyarok úton az Európai Parlamentbe: milyen munka vár a magyar képviselőkre az Európai Parlamentben? (Robert Schuman Foundation, 2002).

Organizations related to the European Union
Political organisations based in Hungary